Andreas Georgiou may refer to:

Andreas Georgiou Papandreou (1919–1996), Prime Minister of Greece from 1981–1989 and 1993–1996
Andreas Georgiou Thomas (1942–2002), Cypriot poet
Andreas Georgiou (politician) (1953–2021), Cypriot politician
Andreas Georgiou (born 1960), Greek economist